George Herbert Babb (January 8, 1864 – December 4, 1950), of Sebago, Maine, was a member of the Maine Legislature. He served in the Maine House of Representatives in the 1917–1918 term. He served in the Maine Senate in the 1919–1920 and 1921–1922 terms.

References

1864 births
1950 deaths
People from Cumberland County, Maine
Members of the Maine House of Representatives
Maine state senators